The PHL-03 is a truck-mounted self-propelled 12-tube 300 mm long-range multiple rocket launcher of the People's Republic of China.

The system is beginning to be replaced by the more modular and newer PHL-16.

Design 
The design is based on the Soviet-made BM-30 Smerch rocket artillery system. The main role for this multiple rocket launcher is to engage strategic targets such as large concentrations of troops, airfields, command centres, air defense batteries and support facilities. It is also used to engage in counter-battery fire missions.

The PHL-03 has the same configuration as the original Soviet counterpart with 12 launch tubes for 300 mm artillery rockets, along with a computerised fire-control system (FCS) incorporating GPS/GLONASS/BeiDou.

Rockets

Standard warheads are high-explosive fragmentation (HE-FRAG), fuel-air explosive, and cluster warheads with anti-armor and anti-personnel submunitions. Cluster warheads can also carry self-targeting anti-tank munitions.

Operators

 People's Liberation Army Ground Force – 175 systems

 
Royal Moroccan Army – 36 systems

 Ethiopian Ground Forces – 4
 Tigray Defense Forces

See also 
 PHL-16 Multiple rocket launcher
 A-100 MRL – lost competition to PHL-03
 M270 Multiple Launch Rocket System

References
5. Go Ballistic: Tigray’s Forgotten Missile War With Ethiopia and Eritrea ↑ https://ethiopanorama.com/?p=143767 

Military vehicles introduced in the 2000s
Multiple rocket launchers
Norinco
Self-propelled artillery of the People's Republic of China
Wheeled self-propelled rocket launchers